Iván Guido López Bilbao (born 10 March 1990) is a Chilean athlete specialising in the middle-distance events. He won several medals on regional level.

In 2016 he tested positive for CERA, a type of EPO, and was banned from competition for four years between 26 February 2016 and 30 May 2020.

Competition record

Personal bests
800 metres – 1:49.29 (São Paulo, Brazil, 23 September 2012)
1000 metres – 2:26.75 (Santiago 2009)
1500 metres – 3:38.56 (Amiens, France, 21 June 2014)
3000 metres – 7:52.53 (Rio de Janeiro, Brazil, 14 May 2016), Chilean record
5000 metres – 13:51.48 (Santiago, Chile, 14 February 2014)

References

External links

1990 births
Living people
Chilean male middle-distance runners
Athletes (track and field) at the 2011 Pan American Games
Doping cases in athletics
Chilean sportspeople in doping cases
South American Games gold medalists for Chile
South American Games silver medalists for Chile
South American Games medalists in athletics
Competitors at the 2010 South American Games
Competitors at the 2014 South American Games
Pan American Games competitors for Chile
People from Santiago Province, Chile
20th-century Chilean people
21st-century Chilean people